Kordasht Castle is a historical castle located in Jolfa County in East Azerbaijan Province, The longevity of this fortress dates back to the Qajar dynasty.

References 

Castles in Iran
Qajar castles